Twic East County is a county located in Jonglei State, South Sudan.  Its headquarters were located at Panyagor.
  In May 2016, Twic East County was divided into Twic North County, Kongor County, Twic Center County, and Twic South County.

Demographics 
Twic East County was composed of five payams: Ajuong, Kongor, Lith, Nyuak, and Pakeer.  According to the Fifth Population and Housing Census of Sudan, conducted in April 2008, Twic East County had a combined population of 8,5349 people, composed of 4,4039 male and 4,1310 female residents.

History
The area encompassed by the former county of Twic East was former colonial Twi Dinka district.

Twic East County was home to the Twic community and it was nicknamed after a founding ancestor named Atwï or Atwïc Ariɛm [Pronounce: Twïny Ariɛm].  According to the Twic origin myth, their ancestors came from Patunduu' or Patundur, which lay to the west of Paliau, where Atwic and his brother, Yieu, lived.  They had a falling out, and Atwic left his brother in Patunduu'.  After Atwic's departure, Patundur suffered an eight-year drought, which only ended when Yiëu asked his brother to return.  When Atwic returned so did the rains, earning him the chieftainship.

Dr. John Garang, a leader of the SPLA and the first Vice President of the Republic of Sudan and president of Southern Sudan was born in Wangulei in Twic East County.

Notable people
 John Garang
 Dr. Majak de Agoot Atem
 Gen. Bior-assuod Ajang Duot Bior
 Gen. David Barach Manyok
 Dr. Elijah Maluk Lueth
 Hon. Atem Garang D. Dekuek, former Deputy Speaker of Sudan National Assembly 2005-2011
 Adut Akech
Hon. Majok Mading

Notes

References

Further reading 
 
 

 
Counties of Jonglei State
Geography of South Sudan
Jonglei State